Pavel Prokopenko (born 24 September 1987 in Moscow) is a Russian pole vaulter.

He finished fifth at the 2006 World Junior Championships. He also competed at the 2007 World Championships, but no-heighted and did not reach the final.

His personal best jump is 5.75 metres, achieved in July 2007 in Debrecen.

External links 

1987 births
Living people
Russian male pole vaulters
Athletes from Moscow